Jutpani is a village development committee in Chitwan District in Bagmati Province of southern Nepal. At the time of the 1991 Nepal census it had a population of 8,762 people living in 1,714 individual households.

Geography
East:  Pithuwa VDC and Shaktikhor VDC
West:  Bharatpur Municipality
North: Padampur VDC
South: Ratnanagar Municipality

Education
Private schools
New Sagarmatha Secondary School, Jutpani-3 (Jutpani Bazzar)
Moon Light Boarding School, Jutpani-1(Shanti Chowk)
Siddhi Vinayak Boarding School Jutpani-1 (Kholesimal Bazzar)
Janapriya Lower Secondary School, Jutpani-4
State schools
Prithivi Higher Secondary School Jutpani-4
Jamunapur Ka Lower Secondary School, Jutpani-5
Sivalaya Primary School, Jutpani-4
Redcross Primary School, Jutpani-4
Rastriya Primary School, Jutpani-3 (Jutpani Bazzar)

Major places
 Gaidakhola Tole
 Jutpani Bazzar
 Kholesimal Bazzar 
 Kalika Temple
 Shanti Nikunja
 Sivalaya Temple, Gurauchour
 Jamunapur
 Bhateni/Prithivi Chowk
Padampur

References

Populated places in Chitwan District
Village development committees (Nepal)